The Botswana national badminton team represents Botswana in international team competitions and is controlled by the Botswana Badminton Association in Gaborone, Botswana. The national team was formed after badminton was starting to be played in Motswana cities, Orapa, Selebi-Phikwe and Jwaneng. 

The Motswana team have competed in the African Badminton Championships mixed team event. The team have also participated once at the Summer Universiade in 2017.

History 
It is not exactly known when badminton was first played in Botswana. In the 1980s, the sport began to spread locally and was played around the Central District in Francistown, Orapa and Selebi-Phikwe. This led to the formation of the Botswana Badminton Association and the Motswana badminton team in 1990. The Botswana Badminton Association soon joined the Badminton World Federation and the Badminton Confederation of Africa under the chairmanship of Ishmael Bhamjee.

The Motswana team first debuted internationally at the African Mixed Team Championships in 2011. In that same year, the Motswana team qualified and competed in the 10th African Games. The team were drawn into Group 4 with South Africa, Congo-Brazzaville and Ethiopia. The team finished 2nd in the group, beating both Ethiopia and Congo-Brazzaville with a score of 5-0 but lost to South Africa. 

The national team continued to compete in the next few editions of the African Mixed Team Championships and later African Games in 2015. The Motswana team placed 3rd in Group 2 and failed to qualify for the quarter-finals.

Participation in BCA competitions 
Mixed team

Participation in Africa Games

Participation in Summer Universiade 
The Motswana team competed in the 2017 Summer Universiade mixed team event. The team was placed in Group G with the United States and Russia. Matches between Botswana and the other two teams were stopped after the Motswana team retired.

Current squad 
The following players were selected to represent Botswana at the 2022 All Africa Men's and Women's Team Badminton Championships.

Men
Perekisi Tshepo
Tumisang Olekantse

Women
Tessa Kabelo
Tebogo Ndzinge

References 

Badminton
National badminton teams
Badminton in Botswana